Kasautii Zindagii Kay is an Indian drama television series produced by Ekta Kapoor under Balaji Telefilms. It was a reboot of Kapoor's 2001 soap opera with the same name. It aired from 25 September 2018 to 3 October 2020 on Star Plus. The series starred Parth Samthaan, Erica Fernandes, Hina Khan, Karan Singh Grover, Aamna Sharif and Karan Patel.

Plot
Anurag Basu and Prerna Basu are twin flames made for each other, yet forced to go through several trials of life to be together.

Set in Kolkata, the story focuses on Anurag and Prerna who study in the same university. Fate keeps pulling them towards each other and as they get to know one another, they slowly form a bond of trust, understanding and friendship. Prerna starts falling for Anurag.

Komolika Chaubey is an arrogant, selfish, evil and narcissistic woman. While Anurag realizes his feelings for Prerna, Komolika starts getting obsessed with him. Anurag and Prerna confess their feelings, consummate their relationship, and plan to marry. Seeing them plan a future together, Komolika creates misunderstandings between them. She asks Anurag to marry her in order to save Prerna's house. Compelled and helpless, Anurag agrees. Unaware of the truth, Prerna is left shocked. Dazed, she gets hit by a car and is taken to the hospital, where she is revealed to be pregnant.

Hurt and rebellious, Prerna enters the Basu house, successfully exposes Komolika and gets her arrested. Komolika escapes prison and returns to kill Prerna, but falls down the terrace and goes missing. Anurag and Prerna happily reunite and get engaged.

Rishabh Bajaj is a successful, powerful and selfish businessman. He falsely frames Anurag and gets him jailed. Further, he asks Prerna to marry him in exchange for Anurag's freedom. Helpless, she agrees. Heartbroken, Anurag questions Prerna. She lies to him, hoping he moves on but Anurag remains adamant and refuses to give up on their love. Rishabh starts falling for Prerna. Aware of the fact that Prerna loves Anurag, Rishabh tries to kill him. When his daughter Kukki ends up getting hurt while trying to stop Rishabh, he steps back. Anurag and Prerna reunite again.

Vengeful, Komolika makes a comeback. Prerna reveals her pregnancy to Anurag and the two rejoice as they get ready to marry. Komolika causes Anurag's accident.

1 month later
Anurag loses his memory. Komolika fakes an identity and misuses the opportunity to make Anurag and the Basus believe that they got married. Prerna discovers Komolika's identity and decides to expose her but refrains in fear of affecting Anurag's memory. Komolika tries to kill Prerna and her child but fails every time.

Prerna gives birth to Sneha, Anurag regains his memory. Komolika threatens Anurag to frame Prerna for murder. She asks Anurag to pretend to push her off the bridge. Rishabh, who still has feelings for Prerna, recommends Anurag to follow the plan, hoping to keep the two away. When Anurag refuses, Komolika threatens life long jail for Prerna. Helpless, Anurag agrees and asks Rishabh to promise to save Prerna.

Anurag pushes Prerna off a bridge and is saved by Rishabh. Komolika then abandons Sneha in an orphanage and bribes a worker to burn it. Reeling from heartbreak and shock, Prerna reaches the orphanage and is devastated to see it on fire. Broken beyond belief, Prerna moves to London with Rishabh.

8 years later
Prerna thrives as a successful businesswoman in London while Anurag's business does well in Kolkata. Prerna maintains a formal relation with Rishabh, still detesting Anurag for his betrayal. Anurag hates Komolika and lives in constant guilt. Prerna leaves for Kolkata to avenge her daughter's death. Anurag and Prerna meet an orphan, and feel a powerful connection to her, unaware that she is Sneha.

Anurag breaks ties with Komolika, reveals the truth to Prerna and shows her the proofs. He explains how he tried to constantly contact her, but was isolated by Rishabh. The two reunite, reminiscing the time they lost, the pain they faced and get remarried. Enraged, Komolika stabs Prerna but ends up wounding Rishabh, when he tries to save Prerna. Rishabh stabs Komolika in return, and kills her. Before dying, Rishabh apologizes to Prerna and Anurag for being selfish and separating them and asks them to take care of Kuki.

1 month later
Anurag and Prerna live a happy life with their daughter Sneha in Kolkata.

Cast

Main
 Erica Fernandes as Prerna Basu: Veena and Rajesh's daughter; Shekhar, Shivani and Mahesh's sister; Anurag's wife, Sneha's mother (2018–2020)
 Parth Samthaan as Anurag Basu: Mohini and Moloy's son; Rakhi, Nivedita and Tapur's brother; Prerna's husband; Sneha's father; Diya's adoptive father (2018–2020)
 Hina Khan / Aamna Sharif as Komolika Chaubey: Siddhant's daughter; Mishka and Ronit's sister; Diya's adoptive mother (2018–2020)
 Karan Singh Grover / Karan Patel as Rishabh Bajaj: Kukki's father; Prerna's one-sided lover (2019–2020)

Recurring
 Shubhaavi Choksey as Mohini Basu: Moloy's wife; Rakhi, Nivedita, Anurag and Tapur's mother (2018–2020)
 Uday Tikekar as Moloy Basu: Prosenjit's brother; Rajesh's childhood friend; Mohini's husband; Rakhi, Nivedita, Anurag and Tapur's father (2018–2020)
 Kanupriya Pandit as Veena Sharma: Rajesh's wife; Shekhar, Prerna, Shivani and Mahesh's mother (2018–2020)
 Kali Prasad Mukherjee as Rajesh Sharma: Moloy's childhood friend; Veena's husband; Shekhar, Prerna, Shivani and Mahesh's father (2018–2019)
 Pooja Banerjee as Nivedita Basu: Mohini and Moloy's daughter; Rakhi, Anurag and Tapur's sister; Anupam's wife (2018–2020)
 Sahil Anand as Anupam Sengupta: Nivedita's husband (2018–2020)
 Upasana Salunke / Priyal Mahajan / Aastha Abhay / Garima Parihar as Tapur Basu: Mohini and Moloy's daughter; Rakhi, Nivedita and Anurag's sister; Sahil's former fiancée (2018–2020)
 Karan Arora as Shekhar Sharma: Veena and Rajesh's son; Prerna, Shivani and Mahesh's brother; Suman's husband (2018–2020)
 Antara Bonerjee / Ritu Chauhan as Suman Sharma: Shekhar's wife (2018–2019) / (2019–2020)
 Charvi Saraf as Shivani Sharma: Veena and Rajesh's daughter; Shekhar, Prerna and Mahesh's sister; Ronit's former fiancée (2018–2020)
Mridul Das as Mahesh Sharma: Veena and Rajesh's son; Shekhar, Prerna and Shivani's brother; Kajal's husband (2020)
Karan Bhanushali as Young Mahesh Sharma (2018–2020)
 Adi Irani as Siddhant Chaubey: Komolika, Mishka and Ronit's father (2018–2019)
 Ariah Aggarwal as Mishka Chaubey: Siddhant's daughter; Komolika and Ronit's sister; Anurag's former fiancé (2018–2019)
 Tarun Mahilani as Ronit Chaubey: Siddhant's son; Komolika and Mishka's brother; Shivani's former fiancé (2018–2020)
Aditi Sanwal as Kukki Bajaj: Rishabh's daughter; Prerna's step daughter. Kaushik's girlfriend (2020)
Jia Narigara as Child Kukki Bajaj (2019)
 Kunal Thakur / Akash Jagga as Kaushik Chakraborty: Rakhi's son; Tanisha's brother; Kukki's boyfriend (2020)
Sumaiya Khan / Tasheen Shah as Sneha Basu: Prerna and Anurag's daughter (2020)
 Bhavya Sachdeva as Sahil Sinha: Vikrant's brother; Tapur's former fiancé (2019)
 Siddharth Shivpuri as Vikrant Sinha: Sahil's brother; Komolika's former boyfriend; Anurag's business rival (2019)
 Alka Amin as Sharda Bajaj: Rishabh's aunt; Tanvi's foster mother (2019)
 Sonyaa Ayodhya as Tanvi Bajaj: Sharda's adopted daughter (2019)
 Sanjay Swaraj as Naveen Chandra Chattopadhyay: Ronita and Madhuri's husband; Prerna's former fiancé (2018–2019)
 Madhura Naik as Madhuri Chattopadhyay: Naveen's first wife (2018)
 Piyali Munshi as Ronita Chattopadhyay: Naveen's second wife (2018)
 Parull Chaudhry as Rakhi Basu: Mohini and Moloy's daughter; Nivedita, Anurag and Tapur's sister; Tanisha and Kaushik's mother (2020)
 Urfi Javed as Tanisha Chakraborty: Rakhi's daughter; Kaushik's sister (2020)
 Namik Paul as Viraj Bhardwaj: Prerna's former fiancé; Komolika's accomplice (2020)
 Shivika Rishi / Arishta Mehta as Diya Basu: Anurag and Prerna's adopted daughter. (2020)
Minal Mogam as Kajal Sharma: Mahesh's wife (2020)
 Shahrukh Sadri as Prosenjit Basu: Moloy's brother; Kumud's husband; Mouli's father (2019)
 Anjali Gupta as Kumud Basu: Prosenjit's wife; Mouli's mother (2019)
 Coral Bhamra as Mouli Basu: Kumud and Prosenjit's daughter (2019)
 Kunal Madhiwalla as Rahil Das: Basu Industries' manager (2019)
 Siddharth Banerjee / Naman Arora as Siddhesh "Sid" Kapoor: Anurag's friend (2018 - 2020)
 Anju Jadhav / Michelle Shah as Anjali Pathak: Prerna's friend (2018)
 Monica Sharma as Kirti Sharma: Prerna and Anjali's friend; Rohan's wife (2018)
 Naveen Sharma as Rohan Sharma: Anurag and Prerna's friend; Kirti's husband (2018)
 Roopali Prakash as Manisha Singhania: Komolika's friend (2018)
 Rohit Sharma as Gaurav Kukreja: Komolika's former boyfriend (2018)
 Neelu Dogra as Rondita Bhasin: Mohini's friend (2020)
 Reema Vohra as Priyanka Gupta: Sneha's caretaker (2020)
 Amit Raghuvanshi / Aashish Bhardhwaj as Sondesh: Kaushik's friend (2020)
 Sabina Jat as Anushka Thapar: Kukki's friend (2020)

Guests
 Sidharth Malhotra as Abhay Singh: To promote Jabariya Jodi (2019)
 Parineeti Chopra as Babli Yadav: To promote Jabariya Jodi (2019)
Vikram Singh Chauhan as Aman Junaid Khan: To promote Yehh Jadu Hai Jinn Ka! (2019)
 Aditi Sharma as Roshni Ahmad: To promote Yehh Jadu Hai Jinn Ka! (2019)
 Ayushmann Khurrana as Karamveer Singh: To promote Dream Girl (2019) 
 Nushrat Bharucha as Mahi Rajput: To promote Dream Girl (2019)
 Rupali Ganguly as Anupamaa Shah: To promote Anupamaa (2020)
 Sudhanshu Pandey as Vanraj Shah: To promote Anupamaa (2020)
 Paras Kalnawat as Samar Shah: To promote Anupamaa(2020)
 Muskaan Bamne as Pakhi Shah: To promote Anupamaa (2020)
 Lankesh Bhardwaj as Inspector  and  Advocate

Production

Development
Kasautii Zindagii Kay is a reboot of the 2001 series of the same name, which was also produced by Ekta Kapoor under Balaji Telefilms for Star Plus.

In February 2018, Ekta Kapoor revealed that she was creating a rebooted version of one of her old series stating:

On 4 July 2018, Kapoor had a meeting with Star Plus regarding the reboot. On 21 July 2018, she announced the Kasautii Zindagii Kay reboot by sharing the teaser of the series.

In September 2018, Shah Rukh Khan introduced Parth Samthaan and Erica Fernandes as Anurag Basu and Prerna Sharma in the first promo of the series.

Kapoor revealed that the character Anurag was named after her director friend and the character Prerna was named after her father's friend Prem Chopra's daughter.

In September 2018, twenty five feet statues of the lead characters Anurag and Prerna were unveiled across ten cities in India by popular actors to promote the series.

The storyline took an eight years leap in February 2020.

Casting
Erica Fernandes was cast to portray Prerna Sharma. Later, Parth Samthaan was confirmed to play Anurag Basu.

Uday Tikekar, Shubhaavi Choksey, Kali Prasad Mukherjee, Kanupriya Pandit, Pooja Banerjee and Sahil Anand were cast to play prominent roles of Moloy Basu, Mohini Basu, Rajesh Sharma, Veena Sharma, Nivedita Basu and Anupam Sengupta.

In October 2018, Hina Khan was introduced as Komolika Chaubey. In June 2019, Karan Singh Grover was introduced as Rishabh Bajaj. Initially, Upasana Salunke played Tapur Basu but was soon replaced by Priyal Mahajan, who was again replaced by Aastha Abhay in April 2019 and yet again replaced by Garima Parihar in March 2020.

In May 2019, Hina Khan took a break from the series. However, in September 2019, Khan confirmed quiting the show and was replaced by Aamna Sharif as Komolika Chaubey in October 2019.

Namik Paul was supposed to enter the series in April 2019 as Vikrant Sinha. However, he chose the lead role in Kavach: Maha Shivratri over Kasautii. Siddharth Shivpuri was then cast to play Vikrant.

In January 2020, Paul finally joined the cast, this time as Viraj Bhardwaj. In March 2020, Karan Singh Grover returned to play Rishabh Bajaj after his break. Post his return, the series took an eight-year leap. Various new additions were introduced including Parull Chaudhry, Kunal Thakur, Urfi Javed, Sumaiya Khan, Mridul Das and Minal Mogam.

In June 2020, when filming was about to resume post the halt owing to the coronavirus pandemic, it was confirmed that Grover will not be returning. On 25 June 2020, Karan Patel was confirmed to be replacing Grover as Rishabh Bajaj. Soon after, Sumaiya Khan was replaced by Tasheen Shah as Sneha Basu. Kunal Thakur, also decided to not return to shoot owing to the pandemic and was replaced by Akash Jagga as Kaushik Basu. Sahil Anand, who played Anupam Sengupta also confirmed not returning post the outbreak. But he decided to return in September 2020 to wrap up the series, which went off air on 3 October 2020.

Filming
Kasautii was mainly filmed in Mumbai in Killick Nixon Studio but certain scenes were shot in Kolkata as the show's storyline was based in West Bengal.

The promo which featured Shah Rukh Khan introducing Parth Samthaan and Erica Fernandes as Anurag and Prerna was shot at Mumbai's Kelve Railway Station.

Parth Samthaan, Erica Fernandes, Karan Singh Grover, Pooja Banerjee, Sahil Anand and Tarun Mahilani flew to Zurich in June 2019 to shoot the Switzerland track.

On 12 July 2020, Parth Samthaan was tested positive for coronavirus and the shooting of the series was halted. The shooting was resumed on 17 July 2020 while the story was tweaked for Samthaan's absence until his return. Erica Fernandes and Aamna Sharif tested negative but were advised to shoot from their respective homes. After a week, Fernandes decided to resume shooting on the sets. On recovering and testing negative, Samthaan quarantined himself for two weeks and returned to shoot on 6 August 2020.

The shooting of the series wrapped up on 18 September 2020.

Broadcast
Kasautii Zindagii Kay was supposed to premiere on 10 September 2018, but was postponed to 25 September 2018.

On 19 March 2020, the shoot of the series was indefinitely halted due to the coronavirus outbreak the airing halted on 23 March 2020 when the remaining episodes were broadcast. After more than three months, the filming of the series was resumed on 27 June 2020. New episodes started airing from 13 July 2020 on Star Plus.

Cancellation
With a drastic decrease in ratings post the coronavirus outbreak, in September 2020 the series was confirmed to go off air in October 2020.

The last episode of Kasautii aired on 3 October 2020.

Reception

Critical response
Shweta Kesari from India Today said, "Parth Samthaan and Erica Fernandes beautifully fit into the shoes of punctual Anurag and carefree Prerna. The grandeur and magnificence of the show will make your jaw drop. The makers have tried to retain the essence of Kolkata and Bengalis. Overall the show is a complete package of entertainment for soap viewers!"

Soumya Srivastava from Hindustan Times described the show as "louder and garnish" and said, "The background score is excessive. It plays without reason and way too often. Whether the scene demands it or not, a joyful, somber or a comical tone is always there to force your brain into thinking that this is how you are supposed to feel right now."

Times Now commented that, "The reboot takes you in the lives of Anurag and Prerna that were part of our every day lives and the first episode is all about nostalgia of the epic Kasautii Zindagii Kay."

Priyanka Bansal from The Quint stated, "Both Erica Fernandes and Parth Samthaan are new and have huge shoes to fill. More often than not, Erica looks bored and still has a long way to go with her acting skills. The chemistry between Parth and Erica too seems to be lacking. When it comes to production values, it of course shows primarily in the sets. As OTT and royal as they come, they scream money from the rooftops."

The Times of India stated, "Kasautii Zindagii Kay 2 has a cinematic appeal. The visuals and the sets are grand. The difference in the financial status of Anurag and Prerna is well brought-out through their homes and familial set-up. Even though the show moves at a swift pace, it is the long introduction of characters in the beginning that is bound to make you impatient. Erica and Parth look their part, yet there is more one wants to see out of them in the upcoming episodes. The first episode is a breezy watch and keeps you hooked."

Soundtrack

Kasautii Zindagii Kays title track was sung and recreated by the composers and singers of the original series, Babul Supriyo and Priya Bhattacharya.

Adaptations

Awards and nominations

References

External links

Balaji Telefilms television series
2018 Indian television series debuts
2020 Indian television series endings
Hindi-language television shows
Indian drama television series
StarPlus original programming
Kasautii Zindagii Kay
Indian television soap operas
Television shows set in Kolkata